The Trisol Music Group, GmbH (or Trisol), is a German         business group and record label headquartered in Dieburg. Owning multiple sublabels, they specialize in producing musical works pertaining to darkwave, dark folk, gothic rock, deathrock, ethereal wave and other gothic genres of music. (Though there are exceptions to this, as Trisol also publishes for musical artists who perform black metal, synthpop, noise music, EBM, Neue Deutsche Härte, dark ambient, neofolk, horror punk, experimental, etc.)  In general they are considered a major European label for works within the realm of Dark Alternative music.

Sublabels 
Source:
Apocalyptic Vision
Armageddon Shadow
Electric Starfish
Iceflower
Liberation and ecstacy
Matrix Cube
Richter Skala
Sad Eyes
Weisser Herbst

Artists 

7th Moon
Alex Fergusson
Ancient Ceremony
ASP
Attrition
Autumn Angels
Black Heaven
Black Tape for a Blue Girl
Calandra (A side project of Dust of Basement by Birgitta Behr.)
Cenobita
Chamber
Charlie Clouser
Christian Death
Cinema Strange
Clan of Xymox
C02
DBS
Die Form
Die My Darling
Dope Stars Inc.
Emilie Autumn
Ext!Ze
Garden of Delight
The Girl & The Robot
Janus
Kirlian Camera
L'Âme Immortelle
London After Midnight
Lore
Mantus
Moi dix Mois
MÜLLÉR OF DEATH!
Nachtmahr
Ostara
Perfidious Words
Persephone
Pilori
Project Pitchfork
Punto Omega
Rome
Rosa CRVX
Rotersand
Saddolls
Samsas Traum
Santa Hates You
Schwarzer Engel
Sopor Aeternus & the Ensemble of Shadows (Sub-Label: Apocalyptic Vision)
Spectra Paris
Sieben
Spiritual Front
The Candy Spooky Theater
The Deadly Ensemble
Tying Tiffany
Vukovar (band)
We Are Temporary
Wolfenmond
XPQ-21
Zeromancer

References

External links
Official Website

German record labels
Horror punk record labels